In tennis, the ATP's Masters Series (currently known as ATP Tour Masters 1000 series) is an annual series of nine top-level tournaments featuring the elite men's players on the ATP Tour since 1990. The Masters tournaments along with the Grand Slam tournaments and the Year-end Championships make up the most coveted titles on the annual ATP Tour calendar, in addition to the Olympics, hence they are collectively known as the 'Big Titles'.

Twelve tournaments have been held as Masters events so far. They were played on three different surfaces: hard outdoors: Indian Wells, Miami, Canada, Cincinnati and Shanghai; indoors: Stockholm (1991–94), Stuttgart (1998–2001), Madrid (2002–08) and Paris; clay: Hamburg (1990–2008), Monte Carlo, Madrid and Rome; carpet indoors: Stockholm (1990) and Stuttgart (1995–97).

Champions by year

Title leaders  

 77 champions in 290  events as of the 2023 Indian Wells Masters.

Career Golden Masters 
The achievement of winning all of the nine active ATP Masters tournaments over the course of a player's career.

Career totals 
 Active players denoted in bold.

Season records

Season totals

Most years of success

Consecutive records

Spanning consecutive events

Spanning non-consecutive events

Most consecutive years of title success

Tournament records

Tournaments won with no sets dropped

Miscellaneous records

Youngest & oldest

Calendar Masters combinations

Triples

Doubles

Title defence 
 Note: Currently active tournaments in bold.

Statistics

Seeds statistics

No. 1 vs. No. 2 seeds in final

Most finals contested between two players

Top 4 seeds in semifinals

Top 8 seeds in quarterfinals

15 of Top-16 seeds in R16

Qualifiers in final

No seeds in final 

 Borna Ćorić is the lowest-ranked (No. 152) Masters champion.
 Andrei Pavel is the lowest-ranked (No. 191) Masters finalist.

Match statistics

Age statistics

All countrymen statistics

All countrymen in final

All countrymen in semifinals

See also 

ATP Tour
 ATP Tour Masters 1000
 Tennis Masters Series doubles records and statistics
 Grand Prix Super Series

WTA Tour
 WTA 1000
 WTA 1000 Series singles records and statistics
 WTA 1000 Series doubles records and statistics

References

External links 
 ATP Masters tournaments
 ATP Masters records and statistics

records and statistics
Masters